Barbara Bosson (November 1, 1939 – February 18, 2023) was an American actress. Her most notable role came in the television series Hill Street Blues (1981–1987), for which she was consecutively nominated for five Primetime Emmy Awards.

Biography
Bosson was born in Charleroi, Pennsylvania, to a tennis coach father. Her first feature film was the crime thriller Bullitt (1968). She is well known for her roles in the 1980s NBC television series Hill Street Blues as the vulnerable Fay Furillo during the series' first six seasons. She later went on to play the tough prosecutor Miriam Grasso on Murder One from 1995 to 1997, which earned her an additional 
Emmy Award nomination.

Bosson starred in the 1970s series Richie Brockelman, Private Eye as Sharon. Her other roles included the series Hooperman and Cop Rock. Some of Bosson's film appearances include her well-known role as Alex Rogan's mother in the science fiction film The Last Starfighter (1984).

Bosson made guest appearances on many series, includung Mannix, Crazy Like a Fox, L.A. Law, Civil Wars, Star Trek: Deep Space Nine (in episode "Rivals" as Roana), and Lois & Clark: The New Adventures of Superman.

In 1970, Bosson married writer-producer Steven Bochco, who created several of the series in which she starred, including Hill Street Blues, L.A. Law, Murder One, and Cop Rock. The couple had two children before divorcing in 1997.

Bosson died in Los Angeles on February 18, 2023, at the age of 83.

Filmography

Film

Television

References

External links
 
 

1939 births
2023 deaths
American film actresses
Actresses from Pennsylvania
American television actresses
Carnegie Mellon University alumni
People from Charleroi, Pennsylvania